Margaret Woodrow Wilson (April 16, 1886 – February 12, 1944) was the eldest child of President Woodrow Wilson and Ellen Louise Axson. Her two siblings were Jessie and Eleanor. After her mother's death in 1914, Margaret served her father as the White House social hostess, the title later known as first lady. Her father remarried in 1915.

Biography
Margaret Woodrow Wilson was born in Gainesville, Georgia, on April 16, 1886. While Wilson's parents were living in the North where her father was teaching at the time of her birth, both of her parents strongly identified with the South. Consequently, Ellen Wilson did not want her children born as Yankees and arranged to stay with family in Gainesville for the births of her first two daughters. Margaret attended local schools, with some associated with the colleges where her father taught.

In his will, Wilson's father had bequeathed her an annuity of $2,500 annually (worth $ today) as long as that amount did not exceed one-third of the annual income of his estate, and as long as she remained unmarried. Wilson sang, and she made several recordings.  In 1914, "My Laddie" was released on Columbia Records, #39195.

In 1938 Margaret Wilson traveled to the ashram of Sri Aurobindo in Pondicherry, India, where she remained for the rest of her life. She became a member and devotee of the ashram and was given the new name 'Nistha', meaning "dedication" in Sanskrit. She and the scholar Joseph Campbell edited the English translation of the classical work on the Hindu mystic, Sri Ramakrishna, The Gospel of Sri Ramakrishna by Swami Nikhilananda, which was published in 1942, by Ramakrishna-Vivekananda Center, New York.

Wilson died from uremia on February 12, 1944, at the age of 57, and was buried in Pondicherry, India, unmarried and without issue.

See also

 The Subtle Body, a history of yoga in America with a chapter on Wilson

References

External links

Woodrow Wilson's Letters to his Darling Daughter from the Shapell Manuscript Foundation

1886 births
1944 deaths
19th-century American women
Acting first ladies of the United States
American expatriates in India
Children of presidents of the United States
People from Gainesville, Georgia
People from Pondicherry
Sri Aurobindo
Woodrow Wilson family
Deaths from uremia
20th-century American singers
20th-century American women singers
20th-century translators